The 2022–23 season is ŠK Slovan Bratislava's 17th consecutive in the top flight of Slovak football.

Slovan are defending their league title for the fourth successive year.

In addition to the domestic league, they will also compete in the Slovak Cup.

As league champion from the previous season, Slovan qualified for the UEFA Champions League. They were eliminated in the second qualifying round. Subsequently, Slovan competed in this season's edition of the UEFA Europa League, but were eliminated in the third qualifying round.

The season covers the period from 1 June 2022 to 31 May 2023.

Players

As of 16 February 2023

Transfers and loans

Transfers in

Loans in

Transfers out

Loans out

Friendlies

Pre-season
Slovan announced the pre-season program on 3 June 2022. The match against Zbrojovka Brno was confirmed later.

On-season

Mid-season
Slovan announced their winter break schedule on 7 December 2022.

Competition overview

Fortuna liga

League table

Regular stage

Championship group

Results summary

Results by matchday

Matches

The league fixtures were announced on 16 June 2022.

Slovak Cup

UEFA Champions League

First qualifying round

The draw for the first qualifying round was held on 14 June 2022.

Second qualifying round

The draw for the second qualifying round was held on 15 June 2022.

UEFA Europa League

Third qualifying round

The draw for the third qualifying round was held on 18 July 2022.

UEFA Europa Conference League

Play-off round

The draw for the play-off round was held on 2 August 2022.

Group stage

The draw for the group stage was held on 26 August 2022 with the fixtures announced on a day later.

Results by matchday

Matches

Knockout phase

Round of 16

The draw for the round of 16 was held on 24 February 2023.

Statistics

Goalscorers

Clean sheets

Awards

Fortuna liga Player of the Month

References

ŠK Slovan Bratislava seasons
ŠK Slovan Bratislava season
Slovan Bratislava
Slovan Bratislava
Slovan Bratislava